Ptychobarbus chungtienensis is a species of cyprinid fish endemic to China.  It is so far only known from Zhongdian in Yunnan.

References 

Cyprinid fish of Asia
Freshwater fish of China
Fish described in 1964